Dave McKenzie is the name of:

 Dave McKenzie (soccer) (fl. 1925), Canadian soccer player, see List of Canadian men's international soccer players
 Dave McKenzie (runner) (born 1943), New Zealand marathon runner
 Dave McKenzie (hammer thrower) (born 1949), American hammer thrower, see 1983 World Championships in Athletics – Men's hammer throw
 Dave McKenzie (artist) (born 1977), American artist

See also
 David McKenzie (disambiguation)
 David MacKenzie (disambiguation)